Engaeus spinicaudatus, the Scottsdale burrowing crayfish, is a species of crayfish in the family Parastacidae. This species is only found in Tasmania, Australia. It is a medium-size burrowing crayfish with an adult carapace length of about 25 millimeters. It usually brown or purplish in color. The species is primarily found in wet buttongrass and healthy plains, but also occurs in surface seepages, floodplains of creeks and wet areas converted to pasture.

Threats 
The principle threats to this species are clearance of native vegetation and lowering of the water table as a result of forestry and agricultural activities. Other threats include downstream effects and road construction and quarrying and the impacts of inappropriate fire management.

References

Sources
Doran, N. & Horwitz, P. 2010. Engaeus spinicaudatus. IUCN Red List of Threatened Species 2010. Retrieved 5 February 2017.

Parastacidae
Freshwater crustaceans of Australia
Critically endangered fauna of Australia
Taxonomy articles created by Polbot
Crustaceans described in 1990